Mictopsichia egae is a species of moth of the family Tortricidae. It is found in Brazil.

The wingspan is about 16 mm. The ground colour of the forewings is orange yellow and consists of basal and subapical streaks and postbasal interfascia. The other parts of ground colour are suffused olive brownish. The terminal area is more orange brownish. The hindwings are orange, the apical third of the wing with a brownish confluent marking.

Etymology
The name refers to the type locality, Ega, now called Tefé, Amazonas, Brazil.

References

Moths described in 2009
Mictopsichia
Moths of South America
Taxa named by Józef Razowski